Jacques Savary de Lancosme was French ambassador to the Ottoman Porte from 1585 to 1589. He was a native of Poitou. He succeeded Jacques de Germiny. Lancosme entered into conflict with the first English Ambassador to the Porte William Harborne.

Lancosme associated himself with the Catholic League and refused to recognize Henry IV of France, leading to his imprisonment by the Ottomans and the nomination of his relative François Savary de Brèves as interim, and then full, ambassador.

See also
 France-Asia relations
 Guillaume Postel

Notes

Ambassadors of France to the Ottoman Empire
16th-century French diplomats
16th-century French people